Reginald James Pierce was a Canadian Anglican bishop in the 20th century.

He was born in 1909, educated at the University of Saskatchewan and ordained Deacon in  1932. In 1934 he was ordained Priest and became Priest in charge of Colinton, Alberta. After this he  was Rural Dean of Grande Prairie and then Rector of South Saanich. Further incumbencies followed in Calgary and Winnipeg before his ordination in 1950 to the episcopate as the 7th Bishop of Athabasca. He retired in 1974 and died on 11 January 1992.

References

1909 births
University of Saskatchewan alumni
Anglican bishops of Athabasca
20th-century Anglican Church of Canada bishops
1992 deaths